The Battle of Tel Hai was fought on 1 March 1920 between Arab irregulars and a Jewish defensive paramilitary force protecting the village of Tel Hai in Northern Galilee. In the course of the event, a Shiite Arab militia, accompanied by Bedouin from a nearby village, attacked the Jewish agricultural locality of Tel Hai. In the aftermath of the battle eight Jews and five Arabs were killed. Joseph Trumpeldor, the commander of Jewish defenders of Tel Hai, was shot in the hand and stomach, and died while being evacuated to Kfar Giladi that evening. Tel Hai was eventually abandoned by the Jews and burned by the Arab militia.

The event is perceived by some scholars as part of the Franco-Syrian War and by some as an outbreak of violence, in the later developing Sectarian conflict in Mandatory Palestine.

Background
Tel Hai had been intermittently inhabited since 1905 and was permanently settled as a border outpost in 1918, following the defeat of the Ottoman Empire in World War I.

The area was subsequently subject to intermittent border adjustments between the British and the French. The Franco-Syrian War took place in early 1920 between Syrian Arab nationalists, under the Hashemite King, and France. Gangs ('isabat) of clan-based border peasants, combining politics and banditry, were active in the area of the loosely defined border between the soon to be established Mandatory Palestine, French Mandate of Lebanon and Syria.

Joseph Trumpeldor had served as an officer in the Russian Army during the Russian-Japanese War of 1905, being one of the few Russian Jews to gain a commission under the Tsar. He had also commanded a Jewish auxiliary unit fighting together with the British Army during the Gallipoli Campaign of the First World War. As such, he was a well experienced military man, whom the Zionist movement could send to command the threatened outpost.

Timeline

Franco-Syrian War
At the beginning of the Franco-Syrian War, the Upper Galilee was populated by several semi-nomadic Bedouin Arab tribes, the largest residing in Halasa, and four tiny Jewish settlements, including Metula, Kfar Giladi, Tel Hai and Hamra. While the Arab villages and Bedouin allied with the Arab Kingdom of Syria, the Jewish residents chose to remain neutral during the Arab conflict with the French.

Early in the war, a Kfar Giladi resident was killed by armed Bedouin, greatly increasing tension in the region. Jewish villages were regularly pillaged by the pro-Syrian Bedouin on the pretext of searching for French spies and soldiers. In one incident, Trumpeldor and other Jews were stripped of their clothes as a public insult by an Arab Bedouin militia.

Battle
On March 1, 1920, several hundred Shiite Arabs from the village of Jabal Amil in southern Lebanon marched to the gates of Tel Hai together with Bedouin from Al-Khalisa and their Mukhtar, Kamal Affendi. They demanded to search Tel Hai for French soldiers. One of the farmers fired a shot into the air, a signal for reinforcements from nearby Kfar Giladi, which brought ten men led by Trumpeldor, who had been posted by Hashomer to organize defense. Joseph Trumpeldor and his ten men attempted to influence the Shiites and roving village militias to go away through negotiation.

Kamal Affendi was allowed to enter the village to search for French soldiers. He encountered one of the female Jewish residents named Deborah who pointed a pistol at Kamal, apparently surprised to see an armed Bedouin in the village. A shot was discharged during the struggle (unclear whether from the pistol or by another weapon) and a major firefight erupted. Trumpeldor was shot and seriously wounded, while the sides barricaded themselves in the village. Kamal Affendi asked to leave, saying it was all a misunderstanding, and the Jewish force approved the cease-fire. During the Arab retreat, one of the Jewish defenders, unaware of the agreements by his comrades and hearing-impaired by the previous firefight, shot at the Arab party, and the exchange of fire recommenced.

Six Jews and five Arabs were killed in the fighting. Trumpeldor was shot in the hand and stomach and died while being evacuated to Kfar Giladi that evening. The survivors of Tel Hai found their position untenable and had no choice but to withdraw,  whereupon the Arabs set fire to the village.

Aftermath
The eight Jews killed at Tel Hai (this number including two killed in a previous probing attack in January 1920) were buried in two common graves in Kfar Giladi, and both locations were abandoned for a time.

On 3 March, Kfar Giladi was also attacked by a large group of Bedouin. The defenders abandoned the position and retreated to the Shia village of Taibe where they were given shelter and an escort to Ayelet Hashahar, which was under British control.

The Franco-Syrian War entered its last stages in July 1920, with the defeat of Hashemite loyalists in the Battle of Maysalun. The border in the area of Upper Galilee was finally agreed between the British and the French, and this area was to be included in Mandatory Palestine. It was thus possible for Tel Hai to be resettled in 1921, though it did not become a viable independent community and in 1926 was absorbed into the kibbutz of Kfar Giladi.

With a national monument in Upper Galilee, Israel commemorates the deaths of eight Jews, six men and two women, including Joseph Trumpeldor. The memorial is best known for an emblematic statue of a defiant lion representing Trumpeldor and his comrades. The city of Kiryat Shemona, literally Town of the Eight was named after them.

The man who had led the attack, Kemal Hussein, represented the Jewish National Fund which in 1939 purchased land for Kibbutz Dafna.

Significance
Idith Zertal has written that it marked 'the dramatic initiation of the violent conflict over Palestine.'

Trumpeldor's heritage

Trumpeldor was severely wounded and died after several hours. He is traditionally credited with having said before dying "No matter, it is good to die (tov lamut) for our country" ("אין דבר, טוב למות בעד ארצנו") words which in Zionist and Israeli collective memory remain closely associated with the names "Trumpeldor" and "Tel Hai". A recent theory has argued that Trumpeldor's last words were, in fact, a pungent curse in his mother-tongue Russian, reflecting frustration with his bad luck, namely 'Fuck your mother' ((Yob tvoyú mat'),:ёб твою мать! ).

The words attributed to Trumpeldor, moreover, are clearly a variant of the well known saying "Dulce et decorum est pro patria mori" ("It is sweet and fitting to die for one's country"), derived from the Odes of the Roman poet Horace – lines with which Trumpeldor, like other educated Europeans of the time, may have been familiar.

 See also 
 Sykes-Picot Agreement
 1920 Nebi Musa riots
 Jaffa riots
 1929 Palestine riots 
 1929 Safed riots
 1933 Palestine riots
 1936–39 Arab revolt in Palestine
 1938 Tiberias massacre

 References

 External links 

 Detailed account of the battle in Hebrew

 Further reading
 Zerubavel, Yael (1991). The Politics of Interpretation: Tel Hai in Israeli Collective Memory, AJS (Association for Jewish Studies) Review'' 16 (1991): 133-160.

Conflicts in 1920
1920 in Mandatory Syria
1920 in Mandatory Palestine
Tel Hai